Ripplemead is an unincorporated community in Giles County, Virginia, United States. Ripplemead has a post office with ZIP code 24150.

References

Unincorporated communities in Giles County, Virginia
Unincorporated communities in Virginia
Census-designated places in Giles County, Virginia
Census-designated places in Virginia